Azlan Misron (born 21 May 1983) is a field hockey player from Chepor, Perak, Malaysia. He is the skipper of Malaysia hockey team in 2008.

He made his debut for the national team in the Sultan Azlan Shah Cup in 2002. He also the skipper of KL HC from 2006 until 2012. In 2013, he joined Terengganu Hockey Team.

References

External links

1983 births
Living people
Malaysian people of Malay descent
People from Perak
Malaysian male field hockey players
Commonwealth Games bronze medallists for Malaysia
Asian Games medalists in field hockey
Field hockey players at the 2002 Asian Games
Field hockey players at the 2006 Asian Games
Field hockey players at the 2010 Asian Games
Field hockey players at the 2014 Asian Games
Asian Games silver medalists for Malaysia
Asian Games bronze medalists for Malaysia
Commonwealth Games medallists in field hockey
Medalists at the 2002 Asian Games
Medalists at the 2010 Asian Games
Field hockey players at the 2006 Commonwealth Games
Southeast Asian Games medalists in field hockey
Southeast Asian Games gold medalists for Malaysia
Competitors at the 2013 Southeast Asian Games
2014 Men's Hockey World Cup players
Medallists at the 2006 Commonwealth Games